This article lists direct English translations of common Latin phrases. Some of the phrases are themselves translations of Greek phrases, as Greek rhetoric and literature reached its peak centuries before that of ancient Rome.

A

B

C

D

E

F

G

H

I

L

M

N

O

P

Q

R

S

T

U

V

Footnotes

References 

Additional references
 
 

 full